Zodarion lutipes is a spider species found in Cyprus, Israel, Lebanon and Jordan.

See also 
 List of Zodariidae species

References

External links 

lutipes
Spiders of Europe
Spiders of Asia
Fauna of Lebanon
Fauna of Jordan
Fauna of Israel
Spiders described in 1872